is a 1989 Japanese comedy film directed by Yoji Yamada. It stars Kiyoshi Atsumi as Torajirō Kuruma (Tora-san), and Keiko Takeshita as his love interest or "Madonna". Tora-san Goes to Vienna is the forty-first entry in the popular, long-running Otoko wa Tsurai yo series.

Synopsis
During his wandering throughout Japan, Tora-san meets a suicidal man. He travels with the man to Vienna, but winds up homesick for Japan.

Cast
 Kiyoshi Atsumi as Torajirō
 Chieko Baisho as Sakura
 Keiko Takeshita as Kumiko Egami
 Akira Emoto as Hyoma Sakaguchi
 Keiko Awaji as Madam
 Shimojo Masami as Kuruma Tatsuzō
 Chieko Misaki as Tsune Kuruma (Torajiro's aunt)
 Gin Maeda as Hiroshi Suwa
 Hidetaka Yoshioka as Mitsuo Suwa
 Hisao Dazai as Boss (Umetarō Katsura)

Critical appraisal
The German-language site molodezhnaja gives Tora-san Goes to Vienna three and a half out of five stars.

Availability
Tora-san Goes to Vienna was released theatrically on August 5, 1989. In Japan, the film was released on videotape in 1996, and in DVD format in 1998, 2005, and 2008.

References

Bibliography

English

German

Japanese

External links
 Tora-san Goes to Vienna at www.tora-san.jp (official site)

1989 films
Films directed by Yoji Yamada
1989 comedy films
1980s Japanese-language films
Otoko wa Tsurai yo films
Shochiku films
Films with screenplays by Yôji Yamada
Films shot in Vienna
Films set in Vienna
Japanese sequel films
Films set in Ishikawa Prefecture
1980s Japanese films